"New World" is the twenty-seventh single by L'Arc-en-Ciel, released on April 6, 2005. It debuted at number 1 on the Oricon chart.

Track listing

References

2005 singles
L'Arc-en-Ciel songs
Oricon Weekly number-one singles
Songs written by Hyde (musician)
2005 songs